CFAM (950 AM) is a radio station broadcasting a community-oriented full service format of classical music, talk radio with a community focus, agricultural and financial reports and religious programming. Licensed to Altona, Manitoba, the station serves the Pembina Valley region of the province.

CFAM shares its location with sister stations CKMW-FM and CJEL-FM.

History 
It first began broadcasting on March 13, 1957 at 1290 kHz before moving to its current dial position in 1968.

The station is currently owned by Golden West Broadcasting.

2017 marked CFAM's 60th anniversary.

External links
CFAM 950
 

FAM
FAM
Radio stations established in 1957
1957 establishments in Manitoba